Claude Bourquard (born 5 March 1937) was a French fencer. He founded Asmb escrime, a fencing club in Besançon.

Honours 
 Bronze medal as part of the épée team in the 1964 Summer Olympics in Tokyo, Japan.

See also 
Fencing at the 1964 Summer Olympics

References

1937 births
Living people
Sportspeople from Belfort
French male épée fencers
Olympic fencers of France
Fencers at the 1964 Summer Olympics
Fencers at the 1968 Summer Olympics
Olympic bronze medalists for France
Olympic medalists in fencing
Medalists at the 1964 Summer Olympics
20th-century French people